Xeneboda mayumbea is a species of moth of the family Tortricidae. It is endemic to the Democratic Republic of the Congo.

The ground colour of the forewings is yellowish cream, but yellower costally. The dots and strigulae are brownish orange. The markings are more brownish than the ground colour and partly paler, reticulate (net like) brown-orange. The hindwings are yellow orange.

Etymology
The species name refers to the type locality, Mayombe.

References

External links

Moths described in 2012
Polyorthini
Insects of the Democratic Republic of the Congo
Moths of Africa
Taxa named by Józef Razowski
Endemic fauna of the Democratic Republic of the Congo